Victor Maistriau (1870–1961) was a Belgian lawyer.

1870 births
1961 deaths
Belgian Ministers of State
20th-century Belgian lawyers
People from La Louvière
Walloon movement activists